is a Japanese professional footballer who currently plays as a goalkeeper for Hong Kong Premier League club HKFC .

Career
Born in Tokyo, Japan, to a Japanese mother and Congolese father, Maholo played youth soccer for Kawasaki Frontale.

In 2003, Maholo enrolled at Boston College, where he joined the soccer team as a freshman. In 2006, he joined Premier Development League side Ocean City Nor'easters (then known as the Ocean City Barons), where he made 8 appearances.

He was relocated to Hong Kong in 2011 to work in the banking industry. After that, he joined HKFC and helped them win promotion to the top-tier Hong Kong Premier League in 2016.

Career statistics

Club

Notes

References

External links
 
 Issey Maholo at The Hong Kong FA

1985 births
Living people
Association football goalkeepers
Sportspeople from Tokyo
Japanese footballers
Japanese people of Democratic Republic of the Congo descent
Boston College Eagles men's soccer players
Ocean City Nor'easters players
Hong Kong FC players
Metro Gallery FC players
Hong Kong First Division League players
Hong Kong Premier League players
American expatriate sportspeople in Hong Kong
Expatriate footballers in Hong Kong
Japanese emigrants to the United States